Ocampos is a surname. Notable people with the surname include:

Clementino Ocampos (1913–2001), Paraguayan composer and poet
Lucas Ocampos (born 1994), Argentine footballer
Otelo Ocampos (born 1983), Paraguayan footballer
Zenón Franco Ocampos (born 1956), Paraguayan chess grandmaster

See also
José Ocampos, a town in Paraguay

Spanish-language surnames